Trigonodactylus is a small genus of Middle-Eastern geckos.

Species
Trigonodactylus arabicus  – Arabian short-fingered gecko, Arabian sand gecko
Trigonodactylus persicus 
Trigonodactylus pulcher  – beautiful short-fingered gecko
Trigonodactylus sharqiyahensis

References

 
Lizard genera